Shelby High School is a high school in Shelby, Michigan. It is part of the Shelby Public School district.

Notable alumni
 Paul Griffin, NBA basketball player
 Wayne Static, musician

References

External links
 

Public high schools in Michigan
Educational institutions established in 1998
Education in Oceana County, Michigan
1998 establishments in Michigan